Put Your Hands Down is the debut studio album of Penal Colony, released in February 1994 by Cleopatra Records.

Reception
Factsheet Five compared the music of Put Your Hands Down favorably to Hate Dept. and described Penal Colony as being "masters of the genre." Industrialnation said "Penal Colony have already left several veteran bands in the dust" and "this music is for thos who like their music angst-ridden and dark, with a live feel."

Track listing

Personnel 
Adapted from the Put Your Hands Down liner notes.

Penal Colony
 Jason Hubbard – sampler, programming, drum programming, production, arrangements
 Dee Madden – lead vocals, sampler, programming, production, arrangements
 Andy Shaw – electric guitar, backing vocals, production, arrangements
 Chris Shinkus – bass guitar, backing vocals, production, arrangements

Additional musicians
 Tyler Anthony – harmonica (8)

Production and design
 John Bergin – cover art
 Brent Curtis – editing
 Michael Hateley – production, engineering
 Ken Jordan – engineering (7, 8, 12)
 Brian Mars – design
 Penal Colony – production, arrangements

Release history

References

External links 
 

1994 debut albums
Penal Colony albums
Cleopatra Records albums